A summary of the year 2010 in the Irish music industry.

Summary

January 
On 7 January, the nominees for the 2010 Meteor Awards were announced.
On 11 January, Neil Hannon was nominated in the Original Score category at the 7th Irish Film and Television Awards for his soundtrack to the film Wide Open Spaces.
On 13 January, the nominees for Best Album of 2009 at the Choice Music Prize were announced.
On 14 January, the BBC admitted giving "inappropriate" promotional coverage and "undue prominence" to U2 and their 2009 album No Line on the Horizon through their use of the U2 = BBC slogan.
From 14 to 16 January: And So I Watch You From Afar, Delorentos, Imelda May and Villagers represented Ireland in the Eurosonic Festival in Groningen, Netherlands. It was broadcast live in Ireland on RTÉ 2fm.
Aftermath of 2010 Haiti earthquake:
15 January: Concern Worldwide's Emergency Appeal fundraiser was held at the weekly Rock' n' Roll club Shakedown in Pacino's on Suffolk Street, Dublin 2.
22 January: Bono performed the collaborative effort "Stranded (Haiti Mon Amour)" at the live televised Hope for Haiti Now: A Global Benefit for Earthquake Relief charity telethon.
24 January: Glen Hansard performed a benefit concert for Haiti in Whelan's, Dublin.
24 January: Noise Control headlined the Help Haiti Fundraising Extravaganza in the Twisted Pepper, Middle Abbey Street, Dublin 2.
31 January: The Answer and David Holmes were among the headlining acts at the Belfast 4 Haiti event.
On 31 January, the 52nd Grammy Awards took place in Los Angeles, United States. Beoga were nominated in the Best Contemporary World Music Album category for their album The Incident. U2 received three nominations. Imelda May performed at the awards ceremony alongside Jeff Beck on the Les Paul tribute, "How High the Moon". May, the second Irish act to perform at the awards in their history, was praised by American critics for "the strong Irish inflection of her pronunciation".

February 
Aftermath of 2010 Haiti earthquake:
On 3 February, Michelle Doherty hosted Haiti Aid at Whelan's and The Village in Dublin, featuring Ham Sandwich, O Emperor, The Chapters and Patrick Kelleher.
On 11 February, Cathy Davey, The Chapters, Julie Feeney and Villagers were scheduled to perform at a Drop Haiti's Debt fundraiser in Vicar Street. This was later cancelled due to "unavoidable circumstances".
On 27 February, Clash Jam Wallop, The Dubtones, Aces Wild, Primitevo and Skelton Crew are among the acts scheduled to perform at Aid for Haiti in Button Factory, Dublin.
In February 2010, U2 won "Best Live Production" for their U2 360° Tour at the 2009 Total Production Awards in London.
On 19 February, the 2010 Ireland Music Awards took place at the RDS in Dublin, presented by Amanda Byram.
On 23 February, the first 33 acts were announced at the Oxegen 2010 launch at The Academy.
On 26 February, Eleanor McEvoy began her 2010 Australian Tour at Nannup Folk Festival in Western Australia, with the final date due on 21 March as part of the Saint Patrick's Day Parade in Sydney.
On 26 February, Prince settled his court case with MCD Productions which had sued the musician after he cancelled a 2008 Croke Park concert at short notice.

March 
On 3 March, the Choice Music Prize for Irish Album of the Year 2009 was awarded during a live ceremony at Vicar Street, Dublin. It was awarded to Adrian Crowley for his album Season of the Sparks.
On 4 March, The Saw Doctors commenced their first Australian tour for seventeen years in Perth. The tour included a Saint Patrick's Day show in Sydney.
On 8 March, Arcade Fire and Fatboy Slim were announced for Oxegen 2010, with this being Arcade Fire's first 2010 European show to be announced.
On 12 March, the 20th anniversary show of Power of Dreams's internationally successful album Immigrants, Emigrants and Me took place at Whelan's in Dublin.
On 12 and 13 March, Delorentos and Something Happens performed at a festival event for Saint Patrick's Day in Den Haag (The Hague).
Between 15 and 20 March 2010: The Waterboys performed twenty poems by William Butler Yeats set to music in the Abbey Theatre, Dublin. All dates had sold out by January: a fifth date was announced for 20 November at the Grand Canal Theatre.
On 17 March, Laura Izibor attended a party at the White House, Washington, D.C., United States at the invitation of President of the United States Barack Obama.
On 17 and 19 March, Irish artists performed at South by Southwest (SXSW) in Austin, Texas, United States.
On 19 March, the first acts of the 2010 Indie-pendence line-up were announced.
On 23 March, Christy Moore and John Spillane performed a show in aid of the 2010 Haiti earthquake at Vicar Street, with proceeds given to GOAL.
On 24 March, Electric Picnic 2010 was launched.
On 25 March, the 2010 IMRO Showcase Tour began in Belfast, continuing until 1 May at The Academy, Dublin.
On 30 March, several new additions to the Oxegen 2010 line-up were announced: these included Dizzee Rascal, Julian Casablancas, Groove Armada, The Black Keys, The Cribs, The Stranglers and Earth, Wind & Fire.

April 
On 7 April, the line-up for Castlepalooza was announced, with tickets going on sale two days later.
On 8 April, six bands competed in the King Kong Club Grand Final music competition at The Village in Dublin.
On 16 April, Ireland's first National Music Day took place, with free live events around the country in locations such as Cork, Limerick and Portlaoise being broadcast on RTÉ lyric fm.
On 13 April, Mindfield, scheduled for 30 April to 2 May, was postponed until Electric Picnic 2010 after several of the acts who intended to be there were distracted by the announcement of 2010 United Kingdom general election for 6 May.
On 17 April, 18 and 20 April April: Whitney Houston played three dates at the O2, Dublin, as part of her first tour for at least eleven years.
On 20 April, Duckworth Lewis Method's Neil Hannon and Thomas Walsh were nominated for an Ivor Novello Award for their debut album.

May 
On 7 May, Kiss played a date in Dublin, taking place at the O2, as part of their Sonic Boom Over Europe Tour.
On 11 May and 12 May, Metallica played their first shows in Belfast for more than two decades, taking place at the Odyssey.
20 May – Ivor Novello Awards at Grosvenor House Hotel, London: Duckworth Lewis Method's Neil Hannon and Thomas Walsh were defeated by Paolo Nutini in their category.

June 
On 2 June, a statue of Rory Gallagher was unveiled in his birthplace of Ballyshannon, County Donegal.
On 3 June, the line-up for Arthur's Day 2010 was announced, including Snow Patrol, Paolo Nutini, José González, and The View.
On 5 June, Snow Patrol played Ward Park in Bangor, County Down, supported by Lisa Hannigan, Band of Horses and General Fiasco. The concert was broadcast on BBC Northern Ireland at a later date.
On 5 June, Westlife played Croke Park, Dublin, with JLS for support. John & Edward were later announced as another support act.
On 8 June, Rage Against the Machine played The O2 in Dublin, with support from Gallows.
On 9 June, The Cranberries played at Thomond Park in their first performance in their native city for more than 15 years.
On 14 June, the complete day and stage breakdown of Oxegen 2010 was announced.
On 23 June, Green Day played Marlay Park in Dublin.
Glastonbury Festival 2010:
On 25 June, U2 were scheduled to headline Glastonbury Festival 2010, their first festival performance for more than a quarter of a century.
On 25 May 2010, it was announced that U2 had cancelled their appearance at the festival to allow Bono's recovery from recent back surgery, with Bono issuing a special message of his heartbreak to the fans – "I'm heartbroken" – and said "we even wrote a song especially for the festival". The following day it was announced that Gorillaz would fill in for U2.
Other Irish acts appearing at the festival included Two Door Cinema Club (24 June), Brian Kennedy, Julie Feeney and The Big Pink (also on 25 June), Christy Moore (26 June) and Ash, Rodrigo y Gabriela, Fionn Regan and Imelda May (27 June).
Cavan quintet Shouting at Planes beat more than 100 other acts to win a competition to play at the festival.
Muse were joined on stage by The Edge to perform "Where the Streets Have No Name".
On 30 June, Sentinel Records closed after ten years.

July 
Oxegen 2010 took place from 9–11 July 2010 at Punchestown Racecourse, County Kildare.
On 15 July, music promoter, manager and entrepreneur Derek Nally died after undergoing a myocardial infarction. His funeral on 19 July was a crowded affair.
On 17 July, Ryan Sheridan played Festival Internacional de Benicàssim in Spain.
On 20 July, Villagers were shortlisted for the 2010 Mercury Prize for the album Becoming a Jackal.
On 23 July Frantic Jack released their debut album 'Independence' and third single Hold On which peaked at No.9 in the Irish charts a week later
On 30 July, Westlife played Lissadell House in County Sligo, their home county, and Iron Maiden played The O2, Dublin.
On 31 July, Leonard Cohen played Lissadell House in County Sligo.

August 
In August, Slane Concert 2010 was to occur and was expected to involve an "international artist". It was later announced that there would be no 2010 concert in Slane.
On 11 August, Liberty Kings guitarist Eoghan Mac Aoidh was killed in a traffic collision in Leicestershire, England, UK.
On 19 August, a man committed suicide during a concert by The Swell Season in the U.S. state of California.
On 27 and 29 August, The Mighty Stef performed at the Reading and Leeds Festivals.

September 
On 1 September, Guns N' Roses performed at The O2, Dublin as part of their Chinese Democracy World Tour. Axl Rose was bottled off the stage. The band also played the Odyssey Arena, Belfast the night before, the first time that Guns N' Roses played indoor shows in Ireland.
On 3, 4 & 5 September, the Electric Picnic 2010 took place in Stradbally, County Laois.
On 7 September, the winner of the 2010 Mercury Prize was announced, with Villagers shortlisted.
On 23 September, Arthur's Day 2010 occurred in Cork, Dublin and Galway.
On 24 & 25 September, Michael Bublé 'performed at the Aviva Stadium, Dublin.

October 
On 2 & 3 October, The Music Show occurred at the RDS, Dublin.
On 29 October, it was announced that Kings of Leon would headline Slane Concert in 2011, the 30th anniversary event. All 80,000 tickets sold out in 40 minutes when they went on sale one week later.

November 
On 24 November, the IMTV Awards took place at The Academy in Dublin.
On 5 November, the BBC, the UK's public service broadcaster, issued an apology to Bob Geldof and the Band Aid Trust, after falsely claiming that money raised for Ethiopia was used to buy weapons instead.

December 
In December, Oxegen 2011 was launched, with headline acts Arctic Monkeys, blink-182 and Foo Fighters.
On 10 December, The Coronas played a headlining show at the Olympia Theatre, Dublin.
On 11 December, Kings of Leon played at The O2 to keep up with demand after their 2011 Slane Concert headliner sold out in 40 minutes.
From 27 December until 2 January, The Saw Doctors performed on a national Christmas tour of Ireland.

Bands disbanded 
 Alphastates (18 February)
 The Upgrades (26 March)
 John Moore leaves HamsandwicH (12 April)
 Glyder (October)

Bands reformed 
 The Hitchers (February)
 Thin Lizzy

Albums & EPs 
Below is a list of notable albums & EPs released by Irish artists in Ireland in 2010.

Singles 
Below is a list of notable singles released by Irish artists in Ireland in 2010.

Festivals

Oxegen 2010 
 Oxegen 2010 took place from 9–11 July.

Electric Picnic 2010 
 Electric Picnic 2010 took place from 3–5 September.

Indie-pendence '10

Castlepalooza '10

Live at the Marquee

Slane 2010 
 Green Day's Billie Joe Armstrong has spoken of his admiration for U2's shows at Slane and, in relation to his band performing there in 2010, has commented: "It's something that's being looked at". However, this longstanding and recurring rumour was dismissed when the band opted to play Marlay Park instead.

Music awards

2010 Meteor Awards 
The 2010 Meteor Awards took place at the RDS in Dublin on 19 February 2010. Below are the winners:

Choice Music Prize 
The Choice Music Prize for Irish Album of the Year 2009 took place at Vicar Street on 3 March 2010.

IMTV Awards 
2010 marked the second year of the Irish Music Television Awards, recognising Irish video makers, directors and artists involved in producing music videos. The awards ceremony took place at The Academy in Dublin on 24 November 2010.

References